Athletics competitions at the 1981 Bolivarian Games were held in Barquisimeto, Venezuela, between December 4–14, 1981.

A detailed history of the early editions of the Bolivarian Games between 1938
and 1989 was published in a book written (in Spanish) by José Gamarra
Zorrilla, former president of the Bolivian Olympic Committee, and first
president (1976-1982) of ODESUR.  Gold medal winners from Ecuador were published by the Comité Olímpico Ecuatoriano.

A total of 38 events were contested, 23 by men and 15 by women.

Medal summary

Medal winners were published.

Men

Women

Medal table (unofficial)

References

Athletics at the Bolivarian Games
International athletics competitions hosted by Venezuela
Bolivarian Games
1981 in Venezuelan sport